Mitrephanes is a genus of South American birds in the tyrant flycatcher family Tyrannidae.

It contains two species:

References

 
Bird genera
Taxonomy articles created by Polbot